Clarence Crase Thomas (December 26, 1886 – April 28, 1917) was an officer in the United States Navy during World War I. Thomas became the first U.S. naval officer to die in the war, after his ship was torpedoed by a German submarine. He was posthumously awarded the Navy Cross.

Early life and career
Born in Grass Valley, California, Thomas was appointed midshipman on July 7, 1904 and graduated from the United States Naval Academy on June 5, 1908. After service in armored cruiser  and gunboat , he was commissioned ensign on June 29, 1910.

Appointed lieutenant (j.g.) on June 26, 1913, he was detached from West Virginia in the summer of 1914 to attend a post-graduate course in steam engineering at the Naval Academy. He attended Columbia University in late 1915 and, on June 24, 1916, reported on board  as her electrical officer.

World War I
Thomas was commissioned lieutenant on January 8, 1917 and was placed in charge of the naval armed guard on the merchant steamship SS Vacuum in April. On the 28th, when a lookout reported sighting a German submarine, some 120 miles west of the Hebrides Islands, Lt. Thomas went to the ship's after gun. A few moments later, a torpedo from  struck Vacuum, and exploded, throwing Thomas and the gun's crew into the water. The ship sank within two minutes. Picked up by a boat, Thomas soon died of cold and exposure.

He was the first United States naval officer to lose his life in the war with Germany and was posthumously awarded the Navy Cross "for distinguished service in the line of his profession as commander of the armed guard crew of the ... Vacuum."

Two ships were named  for him.

See also

References

Notes

1886 births
1917 deaths
People from Grass Valley, California
United States Naval Academy alumni
United States Navy officers
Military personnel from California
American military personnel killed in World War I
Recipients of the Navy Cross (United States)